The sturddlefish is a hybrid of the American paddlefish (Polyodon spathula) and the Russian sturgeon (Acipenser gueldenstaedtii), accidentally created by researchers in 2019 and announced in 2020. Obtaining living hybrids through breeding individuals from different families is unusual, especially given that the two species' last common ancestor lived 184 million years ago. The hybrids were created accidentally during attempts to induce gynogenesis, a type of parthenogenic reproduction where a sperm cell must be present to trigger embryogenesis but does not genetically contribute to the offspring. Hundreds of hybrid fish were created, of which about two-thirds survived over one month, and about 100 survived for one year. As of July 2020, all living hybrid fish are living in captivity at the research lab in Hungary. There are no further plans to create new sturddlefish.

Background
Both the American paddlefish and the Russian sturgeon are endangered species. Researchers in Hungary conducted experiments designed to test if either species could be bred in captivity. As part of these experiments, an attempt was made to induce gynogenesis with each species. During the course of the experiments, the researchers used sperm from paddlefish fathers instead of sperm from sturgeons to act as a control in the fertilizing of female sturgeons. The researchers were surprised when viable offspring resulted.

The two species share a most recent common ancestor which lived in the Early Jurassic, approximately 184 mya. For this reason, the potential for a hybrid between these two species was not initially considered by the researchers, who later speculated that in spite of the long time span that there were relatively few genetic changes between the species. Both fish have been called "living fossils" due to their slow evolution over time. The American paddlefish is the only species of paddlefish living after the likely extinction of the Chinese paddlefish in 2019. Sturgeons are considered by IUCN to be the most critically endangered group of species in the world based on over 85% of sturgeon species being at risk of extinction.

Description
Two distinct groups of hybrids were formed. Individuals in the first group have approximately equal amounts of DNA from each species, and display approximately equal amounts of physical characteristics from each parent. Members of the other group contained approximately twice as much sturgeon DNA due to chromosome doubling, and for this reason have physical appearances more similar to sturgeons. It is expected that the sturddlefish hybrids will be sterile, as is the most frequent outcome for hybrids with distantly related parents.

Potential
The hybrid fish may have potential uses to reduce the carbon footprint and cost of feeding farm fish cultivated for caviar production among other things. However, due to likely being sterile as hybrids, this is most likely not an option. As a result of this, along with the unknown effects that the sturddlefish could have on ecosystems, the researchers who created the sturddlefish have decided not to create more.

References

Fish hybrids
Sturgeons